Oxford Sunnyside Football Club, formerly Oxford United F.C., is an intermediate-level football club playing in the Intermediate A division of the Mid-Ulster Football League. They are based in Lurgan, County Armagh and play their home games at Knockrammer Park, 
The club changed its name in 2011 in an attempt to strengthen its connections with Sunnyside youth club. Club colours are white shirts with red shorts.

Honours

Intermediate honours
Bob Radcliffe Cup:  2
1987–88, 2022-23
Mid-Ulster Intermediate B League Winners: 1
2018-19
Alan Wilson Cup: 1
2017-18

Junior honours
Irish Junior Cup: 7
1981–82, 1983–84, 1987–88, 1988–89, 1992–92, 1994–95, 1997–98 (first team to win a record 7 IFA Junior Cups) 
Mid-Ulster Shield: 8
1982–83, 1983–84, 1989–90, 1990–91, 1991–92, 1992–93, 1993–94, 1994–95
Mid-Ulster Football League: 13
1980–81, 1981–82, 1983–84, 1984–85, 1986–87, 1987–88, 1988–89, 1989–90, 1990–91, 1991–92, 1992–93, 1993–94, 1994–95

References

Mid-Ulster Football League clubs
Association football clubs in Northern Ireland
Association football clubs in County Armagh
Lurgan